3,5-Dimethylpiperidines are chemical compounds with the formula C5H8(CH3)2NH.  Two diastereomers exist: the achiral R,S isomer and the chiral R,R/S,S enantiomeric pair. 3,5-Dimethylpiperidine is a precursor to tibric acid.

The compound is typically prepared by hydrogenation of 3,5-dimethylpyridine.  Both diastereomers also arise from the reduction of 3,5-dimethylpyridine with lithium triethylborohydride.

References

Piperidines